Buckland Historic District is a national historic district located at Buckland, Prince William County, Virginia. It encompasses 30 contributing buildings, 11 contributing sites, and 6 contributing structures in the town of Buckland.  The district is centered on a grist mill (c. 1899), Buckland Mill, the third such structure located on the site.  Besides the mill, the most significant buildings include an early 19th-century wagon tavern and a small church (c. 1857). For the most part the houses are small, simple, 19th-century dwellings  constructed of log, frame or stone; most were intended to serve a commercial as well as a residential purpose.  Other contributing resources include the mill race and dam, Cerro Gordo plantation, portions of the Civil War Buckland battlefields, the Kinsley Mill and miller's house, and Buckland Hall (c. 1774).

It was added to the National Register of Historic Places in 1988, with a boundary increase in 2008.

References

Historic districts in Prince William County, Virginia
Federal architecture in Virginia
Georgian architecture in Virginia
National Register of Historic Places in Prince William County, Virginia
Historic districts on the National Register of Historic Places in Virginia